The Chosen One

Premise
The Chosen One follows three young doctors who travel to a village in the Pantanal to vaccinate the residents against a new mutation of the Zika virus . They end up trapped in this community full of secrets and whose residents are devoted to a mysterious leader, who has the gift of healing illnesses in a supernatural way.

Cast and characters
 Shahar Isaac as Simon
 Renan Tenca as "The Chosen One"
 Pedro Caetano as Pharisee Pedro
 Gutto Szuster as Young Shepherd Vergani
 Mariano Mattos as Young Shepherd Mateus
 Alli Willow as Mary
 Tuna Dwek as Zulmiro
 Kiko Vianello as Dr. Lorenzo Emanuel
 Francisco Gaspar as Pharisee Silvino
 Aury Porto as Pharisee Vicente
 Lourinelson Vladmir as Rabbi

Episodes

Season 1 (2019)

Season 2 (2019)

Production

Development
The series was officially announced on July 20, 2018. Netflix revealed that the production would be inspired by the Mexican series Ninõ Santo, created by Pedro Peirano and Mauricio Katz and based on the original idea of Pablo Cruz. The Brazilian version was adapted by the couple of writers Raphael Draccon and Carolina Munhóz.

Filming
Principal production of the first season commenced on September 22, 2018 in Brazil in the city of Porto Nacional, Tocantins. On October 9, 2018 the production moved to Natividade, with some scenes planned to be shot in some of the city's main touristic sites.

Release 
On 17 May 2019, the teaser trailer for the series was released.

References

External links 
 The Chosen One on Netflix
 

2010s Brazilian television series
2019 Brazilian television series debuts
Portuguese-language Netflix original programming
Brazilian drama television series
Brazilian mystery television series
Brazilian thriller television series
Brazilian television series based on Mexican television series
Television shows filmed in Tocantins
Television series about cults